Fragrant Hills station is a station on Xijiao line (light rail) of the Beijing Subway. This station opened to public on 30 December 2017.

Station Layout 
The station has an at-grade single-sided platform.

Accidents 
On 1 January 2018, tram XJ003 derailed after a malfunction when exiting Fragrant Hills station at 2:36 PM with no passengers on board. The tram slid down the tracks with its control lever still at traction position after being lifted back on to the tracks later that day. The station was thus temporarily closed until 1 March 2018 after the derailment.

References

Beijing Subway stations in Haidian District
Railway stations in China opened in 2017